Lemyra praetexta is a moth of the family Erebidae. It was described by Karel Černý in 2011. It is found on the Philippines, where it has been recorded only from the mountains of Palawan.

The length of the forewings is about 14 mm. The basal part of the forewings is greyish brown with two beige spots. The outer third of the wing is beige. The hindwings are also beige.

Etymology
The species name refers to the markings on the forewing and is derived from praetextus (meaning fringed).

References

praetexta
Moths described in 2011